The 2019 season for  will begin in January with the Tour Down Under. As a UCI WorldTeam, they will be automatically invited and obligated to send a squad to every event in the UCI World Tour.

Team roster

Riders who joined the team for the 2019 season

Riders who left the team during or after the 2018 season

Season victories

National, Continental and World champions 2019

Footnotes

References

External links
 

Team Sunweb
2019
Team Sunweb